Zsolt Szabó may refer to:
 Zsolt Szabó (referee) (born 1972), Hungarian football referee
 Zsolt Szabó (politician) (born 1963), Hungarian agronomist and politician
 Zsolt Szabó (racing driver) (born 1995), Hungarian racing driver
 Zsolt Szabó (footballer) (born 1986), Hungarian footballer